The Nikon FG-20 is a 35 mm film single-lens reflex (SLR) camera with interchangeable lenses. It was released in 1984 by Nippon Kogaku K. K. (now the Nikon Corporation) as the successor to the earlier EM and FG cameras. It is actually a downgrade from its most direct predecessor, the FG, lacking the FG's program auto exposure mode. It uses the same vertical-travel metal focal-plane shutter as the FG,  with electronically timed speeds from 1 to 1/1000 second as well as bulb and a mechanically timed 1/90-second speed.

The FG-20 could be considered a variant of the FG, as the differences between the two are the omission of program mode, exposure compensation dial, and TTL/OTF flash metering from the FG.

References
 Nikon Imaging | Nikon FG-20
 Specification for Nikon FG-20"

External links

 Nikon FG-20 Camera Index Page at Photography in Malaysia

FG-20
FG-20